Middlesbrough Council, formerly known as Middlesbrough Borough Council, is a unitary authority based in Middlesbrough in North Yorkshire, England. The authority has combined some duties with its nearby councils to form the Tees Valley Combined Authority. The borough is often considered to be larger than current borough boundaries, with a total built-up population of 174,700. It is in the statistical region of North East England.

The council's borough had a resident population in 2001 of 134,855. A 2006 mid-year estimate suggests the Borough to have a population of 138,400. The borough council unsuccessfully bid to achieve city status in 2012, to celebrate the Queen's Diamond Jubilee.

History
Middlesbrough Borough Council was formed on 1 April 1974, under the Local Government Act 1972, from part of the former County Borough of Teesside, along with the parish of Nunthorpe from the Stokesley Rural District.  It was a district, and the county town of the new county of Cleveland from 1 April 1974, until 1996. As a district, it was one of the four constituent districts of Cleveland: Cleveland being the upper tier in the two-tier system. When Cleveland was abolished under the Banham Review, Middlesbrough became a unitary authority and as such took on the rights and duties of a county, and only ceremonially part of North Yorkshire, but not run by it.

The borough borders Stockton-on-Tees unitary authority to the west, Redcar and Cleveland unitary authority to the east and the Hambleton district of North Yorkshire to the south.

Mayor
As a borough council Middlesbrough is entitled to a mayor. Middlesbrough's council is led by a directly elected mayor, currently Andy Preston.

2011 election

Political composition

Below is the political composition of the council in 2008 and 2011.

The borough has 23 council wards. Middlesbrough is mostly unparished, with Nunthorpe and Stainton and Thornton being the only parishes.

Coat of arms

The original coat of arms of the Borough was devised in the nineteenth century by William Hylton Dyer Longstaffe, and regranted in 1996 with slight modifications after the dissolution of Cleveland County. The images, from the collection of the Heraldry Society,
will be found on Robert Young's Civic Heraldry website.

References

External links
Middlesbrough Council Website

Politics of Middlesbrough
Unitary authority councils of England
Mayor and cabinet executives
Local education authorities in England
Billing authorities in England
Leader and cabinet executives
Local authorities in North Yorkshire